Hélder de Jesus Serafim Vicente, also known as Hélder Vicente (born September 30, 1975) is an Angolan football player. He has played for the Angolan national team.

Vicente is the only Angolan player to have been a champion in all four Angolan clubs where he played in the Girabola.

National team statistics

References

1975 births
Living people
Angolan footballers
Atlético Petróleos de Luanda players
Atlético Sport Aviação players
C.D. Primeiro de Agosto players
G.D. Sagrada Esperança players
Girabola players
Angola international footballers
Association football defenders